The 1991 Wyoming Cowboys football team represented the University of Wyoming in the 1991 NCAA Division I-A football season. It was the Cowboys' 96th season and they competed as a member of the Western Athletic Conference (WAC). The team was led by head coach Joe Tiller, in his first year, and played their home games at War Memorial Stadium in Laramie, Wyoming. They finished with a record of four wins, six losses and one tie (4–6–1, 2–5–1 WAC). The offense scored 305 points, while the defense allowed 357 points.

Schedule

Reference:

Roster

Team players in the NFL
The following were selected in the 1992 NFL Draft.

References

Wyoming
Wyoming Cowboys football seasons
Wyoming Cowboys football